Laodicea was a port city and important colonia of the Roman Empire in ancient Syria, near the modern city of Latakia. It was also called Laodicea in Syria or Laodicea ad mare. Under Septimius Severus, it was the capital of Roman Syria, and of the Eastern Roman province of Theodorias from 528 to 637 AD.

History

The Phoenician city of Ramitha was located in the coastal area where the modern port of Latakia is, known to the Greeks as Leukê Aktê or "white coast". Laodicea got its name when was first founded in the fourth century BC under the rule of the Seleucid Empire: it was named by Seleucus I Nicator in honor of his mother, Laodice. The city was subsequently ruled by the Romans until the Arab conquest of that city in 636 AD.

The Roman Pompey the Great conquered the city from the Armenian king Tigranes the Great along with all of Syria in 64 BCE and later Julius Caesar declared the city "free polis". During the Severan dynasty, a third century imperial dynasty of Rome from Syrian origins, the emperor Septimius Severus named with the title "Metropolis" the city in 194 AD and allowed the Ius Italicum (exemption from empire taxation) to Laodicea, that was later called a "Roman Colonia". Some Roman merchants moved to live in the city under Augustus, but the city was always culturally "greek" influenced. The Romans made a "Pharum" at the port, that was renowned as one of the best of Ancient Levant; then created a Roman road from southern Anatolia toward Berytus and Damascus, that greatly improved the commerce through the port of Laodicea.

The city enjoyed a huge economic prosperity thanks to the wine produced in the hills around the port and exported to all the empire. The city was famous because of the textile products. Laodicea minted coins from an early Roman date, but the most famous are from Severian times.

A sizable Jewish population lived in Laodicea during the first century.   Under Septimius Severus the city was fortified and was made for a few years the capital of Roman Syria: in this period Laodicea grew to be a city of nearly 40000 inhabitants and had even an hippodrome.

Christianity was the main religion in the city after Constantine I and there were many bishops of Laodicea who participated in ecumenical councils, mainly during Byzantine times. The heretic Apollinarius was bishop of Laodicea in the 4th century, when the city was fully Christian but with a few remaining Jews.

An earthquake damaged the city in 494 AD and successively Justinian I made Laodicea the capital of the Byzantine province of "Theodorias" in the early sixth century. Laodicea remained its capital for more than a century until the Arab conquest.

Bishops of Laodicea

Saint Paul visited Laodicea and converted the first Christians in the city. Slowly the bishops of Laodicea grew in importance but were always under the Patriarch of Antioch. The most important bishops were:

 Lucius of Cyrene (1st century), mentioned in Acts, considered first bishop by tradition
 Thelymidres (fl. 250–251), bishop during the Decian persecution
 Heliodorus, became bishop during the reign of Trebonianus Gallus (251–253)
 Socrates (died. c. 264)
 Eusebius (died c. 268), a native of Alexandria in Egypt
 Anatolius (c. 268 – 282/283), a native of Alexandria in Egypt
 Stephen, apostasized during the Diocletianic persecution (303–313)
 Theodotus (303/313 – c. 335), an Arian
 George (died 359), an Arian
 After George there were two rival bishops in Laodicea:
 Pelagius (360–381/394), an Arian
 Apollinarius (c. 360 – c. 392), founded the Apollinarians
 Elpidius, bishop by 394, deposed in 404, restored in 416
 Macarius (429-451)
 Maximus (around 458)
 Nicia
 Costantinus (510–518)
 Stephanus (553)

Notes

Bibliography

 Butcher, Kevin. Roman Syria and the Near East Getty Publications. Los Angeles, 2003 
 Ross Burns. Monuments of Syria: A Guide. Publisher I.B.Tauris. New York, 2009

See also
 Berytus
 Theodorias (province)
 Apollinaris of Laodicea
 Antioch

Populated places established in the 4th century BC
Populated places disestablished in the 7th century
Seleucid colonies
Coloniae (Roman)
Roman sites in Syria
Populated places of the Byzantine Empire
Archaeological sites in Latakia Governorate
Latakia